Ilijić is a Serbo-Croatian language surname with the meaning "son of Ilija".

Ilija is the Croatian version of Elijahu which in Hebrew means “my God is Jahwe”. Some Jews carrying that name were later christianised.

Source: https://www.parents.fr/prenoms/ilija-43171

People with the name include:
Grgo Ilić, was a Franciscan friar and bishop from Bosnia and Herzegovina
Alen Ilijić (1975), Serbian composer
Đuraš Ilijić (1326–62), Serbian nobleman 

Patronymic surnames
Croatian surnames
Serbian surnames